Civilización o Barbarie (Civilization or Barbarism) is a tape-cycle from 1984 by the Argentinian composer Bernardo Mario Kuczer.

Structure

The basic cycle
The basic cycle comprises 18 independent tape pieces, some of them with different versions. Each piece can be performed separately and individually, as well as in open and variable groupings with other pieces of the cycle. The total duration of the basic cycle, (basic 18 pieces), amounts to some two and a half hours, extending to over three hours when all the different versions are included.

The cycle as a whole
Although each of the 18 pieces and the different versions of them, are in themselves completely independent, self-contained entities, the cycle as a whole embodies different groups of works and work-groups, which can also be understood as "cycles within the cycle", as follows:

The "Peripéteia" cycle:
                                                      Duration
  Peripéteia IIa, IIb’, (IIb’’), IIc, IIe’’, IIf (IIa = 2'20")
  Peripéteia III                                        3'33"
  Peripéteia IV                                        12'41"
  Peripéteia V                                          8'00"
  Peripéteia VI                                         6'25"
  Peripéteia VII: Iña’K                                 3'14"
  Peripéteia VIII: Periplo                             11'40"

The group: "… de la mémoire":
  Une mémoire la vie                                   10'08"
  Finale, ou la mémoire pulsante                        9'39"
  Cri de la mémoire fermée                             15'00"

The pieces: "Ejercicio de aire":
  Version: (2 + c x 2)                                  8'36"
            C   2
  Version: (1C + st)                                    8'36"
  Version: (1b)                                         8'47"
  Version: (C + 1x 10)                          16'00"
            2

A cycle of single pieces which belong only to the whole cycle:
  Contre-rime                                          10'36"
  one other desert                                      9'32"
  Him’l                                                 7'19"
  Dream line                                            7'57"
  Escenas-Miró                                          7'57"
  hole the black                                        5'45"
  … und Stille daneben                                  6'16"

Program note from 1984

CIVILIZACION  O  BARBARIE  (1984)

The process of writing music (written music) involves only some "particular" channels of decision making. These "normal" channels have been moulded by our own personal history to react and give answer to a certain "system of logics" designed to solve the conflict arising between our own inner fantasies, expectations, limitations and desires and the ones which the outer world, society, press on us. This tape-cycle is an experience in trying to break through some of these defences, attempting to voyage some of the forbidden parts of myself, leaving behind "sounding traces" proof of the existence of other "civilizations or barbarisms" in me.
The title challenges the listener to make a judgment and decide which of these two territories I have visited.
Bernardo Mario Kuczer

Performance practice
Civilización o Barbarie is the general title under which eighteen independent tape pieces, with individual names, are gathered. "Each piece in this cycle can be played individually, as well as in (open) groups with other pieces of the cycle". Kuczer has written extensive instructions regarding possible performances of grouped pieces of the cycle, in particular, marking the importance of a very careful selection and sequencing of the pieces into what he later called a particular "concert-form" He also gave indications about the maximum number of pieces conforming such a form, of its maximum total duration and about the approximate duration of the pauses in between the individual pieces. He suggested also, how the auditorium should be prepared with regards to lighting and ambiance.

Performance examples

Darmstadt 
Presented at the Darmstädter Ferienkurse, 28 July 1984, 1:00 AM:
 "Him’l" (7'19")
 "Peripéteia V" (8'00")
 "Ejercicio de aire (2/C + c/2 x 2)" (8'36")
 "Peripéteia VII: Iña’K" (3'14")
The pieces were threaded by relatively short pauses. The duration of the music itself amounted to c. 25 minutes.

Como, Italy 
Presented at the 18th Annual "Autunno Muscale" festival, Como, Italy, 5 October 1984, 6:00 PM
 "Peripéteia VII: Iña’K" (3'14")
 "Cri de la mémoire fermée" (15'00")
 "Peripéteia VIII: Periplo" (11'40")
 "Une mémoire la vie" (10'08")
The total duration amounted to c. 40 minutes, with long pauses in between pieces.

Paris
Presented at "Perspectives du XXe siècle", at the Grand Auditorium of the Maison de Radio France, Paris, France, 19 January 1985, 10:30 PM
 "Contre-rime" (10'36")
 "Ejercicio de aire: (2/C + c/2 x 2)" (8'36")
 "Peripéteia VII: Iña’K" (3'14")
 "Peripéteia VIII: Periplo" (11'40")
 "Une mémoire la vie (Version A)" (10'08")
This concert featured bridging pauses between the pieces lasting exactly one minute each, bringing the total duration of the performance to some 45 minutes. The complete concert was recorded and broadcast during 1985 on Radio France.

Basel 
Presented at "Volkshaus" by the International Society for Contemporary Music, Basel, 14 September 1985.

This concert represents an example of a completely different type of concert situation and concert-form. In the first part of the program, the "Peripéteia II e’’" (2'28") was played between orchestral and instrumental works (performed by the Symphony Orchestra Basel conducted by Bernhard Wulff), separated by large pauses. The second half of the concert consisted entirely of tape pieces of the cycle. The general concert-form was organized as follows: 

 "Peripéteia II e’’" (2'28")                   within first half
 
 "Peripéteia II b’" (2'24")          second half
 "Peripéteia V" (8'00")
 "Peripéteia VI" (6'25")
The pieces alternated with (relatively) long pauses. The complete duration of the second half comprised c. 22 minutes.

The images below show the Sound-Space-Form designed for this concert.

Bremen
Presented at the Festival "Transit" Orte/NichtOrte [somewhere/nowhere], at the Kulturzentrum Schlachthof, Bremen, Germany, 12 November 1999, 11:00 PM

A relatively long concert, one with a challenging Concert-Form was planned and publicly announced:
 "Peripéteia II a’’" (2'20")
 "Peripéteia II b’’" (2'24")
 "Peripéteia II e’’" (2'28")
 "Peripéteia VI"   (6'25")
 "Dream line"      (7'57")
The pieces would alternate with long (irregular) pauses. The planned total duration of the concert was to reach c. 25 minutes.

In the end, the concert could not be realized the way it was planned. Instead, only "Peripéteia II e’’" was performed.<ref>The composer commented in his concert log-book of 1999:
"As with many "inventions", external, unforeseen ("technical") matters culminated in a truly extra-ordinary concert experience: the whole concert, the "Concert-Form" in its entirety, was precisely filled by the music of a single work lasting the full 2 minutes 28 seconds of the Peripéteia II e'''' ". (Quoted with the permission of the artist)</ref>

Work history
In 1984 Kuczer was invited to perform a first concert with pieces from Civilización o Barbarie at the "Darmstädter Ferienkurse" in Darmstadt. The invitation was made on behalf of Brian Ferneyhough, who had the chance to hear some of the pieces beforehand. In a letter to the organizers he wrote: "In my opinion these pieces... are partly of very great interest". And later: "... I consider him to be a major composer in this area".

The first public performance of some of the pieces from Civilización o Barbarie took then place at a Studio-Concert in the “Darmstädter Ferienkurse” on the 28 July 1984. (see 3.1.1) For this cycle, Kuczer was awarded the Kranichsteiner Musikpreis ("Kranichstein Music Prize"), the first time the award was granted to a Latin American.

In 1986, for the next edition of the Darmstadt Courses, Kuczer was invited to perform a second concert with works of the cycle.Civilización o Barbarie was later selected as "personal choice of the jury" by Klaus Huber, one of the three jurors, for the ISCM (International Society for Contemporary Music) World Music Days, which took place in Cologne in 1987.

Although between 1984 and 1999 several of the works belonging to the Civilización o Barbarie cycle have been performed a number of times, either in "Group-form" and/or also individually as part of mixed concerts in different cities of Europe, a substantial part of the pieces have remained unplayed.Note: Masters, copies and materials, which amount to more than 200 tapes, have not yet undergone the process of digitalization (August 2013)

Reception
The performances of the pieces of Civilización o Barbarie, although generally considered as a "secret tip", have often been surrounded by great controversy and even true scandals: listeners (even full orchestras) running out of the concert hall,"... the volume drove the orchestra musicians from the stage, the General Musikdirektor (and others) from the hall...". M.F. in Westdeutsche Allgemeine Zeitung, 6 July 1987 parts of the public being horrified, the pieces being smeared by the most conservative part of the audiences and their music critics. Some reports contain mixed feelings showing that the musicians and critics were somehow under shock, moved, puzzled, perhaps confused, revolted, captivated and outraged at the same time, having to admit, though, that something in a way "unforgettable" had taken place.

The premiere of Civilización o Barbarie'' in Darmstadt in 1984 was described by Hans-Joachim Hespos as follows:
... whoever once in his life has stood, with fluttering pant legs, in the middle of loud blasting sound-waves before loudspeekers, knows what loudness can bring about. I heard this once in my life, in a performance of a piece by the Argentinian composer Bernardo Kuczer. An interesting sound-work... all that has been captured, edited and projected with excessive decibels through big speakers: such a gross terribleness has remained unforgettable to me.

Other well known musicians and serious music critics have given their opinion.

Reinhard Oehlschlägel, editor of MusikTexte, called it "a highly complex, experimental and political music," and later described it as "The sonically most extreme example [of a series of tape compositions by Latin American composers introduced at the Cologne Musikhochschule], as was already the case at the Darmstädter Ferienkursen 1986."

Monika Lichtenfeld called it "a music of bursting wildness and signal setting expressiveness" composed of "archaic, crude, complexly towered sounds."

The author Antonio Trudu wrote in his comprehensive book about Darmstadt referring to the concert of 1984:

...the Argentine Bernardo Kuczer, whose immense cycle of electroacoustic pieces, under the title Civilización o Barbarie, was presented at such a volume, that induced many of the present to listen from outside the hall, being this one of the most extraordinary pieces of music that were heard in Darmstadt this year...

And referring to the 1986 concert:
from Bernardo Kuczer we heard another two parts (Peripéteia III and Cri de la mémoire fermée) from his monumental cycle Civilización o Barbarie.

The following statement by the Belgian musicologist Harry Halbreich stands as a notable representative of the controversy:
However, the end of the evening had to be spent... in the company of the Argentinian Bernardo Kuczer living in Germany and some of his apocalyptic electroacoustic pieces grouped into an immense cycle under the title Civilización o Barbarie. I admit that I fled. But two days later I was able to hear again, at a somewhat more bearable volume level, these extraordinary pieces of music of a visionary madman, skinned alive, bleeding shreds of flesh of a prodigious expressive power, produced, paradoxically, with a simple cassette tape recorder!

Notes

References

External links
 INDEX in: Music since 1900, 6th Edition Kuhn, Laura, Schirmer Books 2001, p. 1003
 Music since 1900, p. 748
 Chronology of the Kranichsteiner Musikpreis

Electronic compositions
1984 compositions